The 3rd Bangladesh National Film Awards were given by the Government of Bangladesh for releases in 1977. It was the third ceremony of National Film Awards. Every year, a national panel appointed by the government selects the winning entry. This year awards were given by Ziaur Rahman, the President of Bangladesh, at the Vice President's House in Dhaka on January 9, 1979.

List of winners
This year awards were given in total 11 categories. Best Actor in a Supporting Role, Best Child Artist, and Best Male Playback Singer awards were not given this year.

Merit awards

Technical awards

Achievements
 Bobita won her third award in Best Actress category.

See also
Bachsas Awards
Meril Prothom Alo Awards
Ifad Film Club Award
Babisas Award

References

External links

National Film Awards (Bangladesh) ceremonies
1977 film awards
1979 awards in Bangladesh
January 1979 events in Bangladesh
1970s in Dhaka